Ion Dosca (born 2 January 1955) is a Moldavian Brazilian draughts player, international grandmaster since 1996 and world champion in 1999. Dosca also plays other variants of draughts, such as Russian checkers and pool checkers and won numerous national championships in both variants.

Sports career 
Ion Dosca played in Soviet junior competitions from the age of 12. At 15, he won the Moldavian SSR youth championships in Russian checkers. In the early 1970s Dosca made first real successes on the All-Union level, winning the silver medal at the All-Union junior Trade Unions Sports Society championships in 1971 and taking the title at the same competition in the next year. In 1974 Dosca won his first Moldavian senior title and received a Master of Sport rank. In 1980 and 1990 Dosca won the USSR Cup in Russian checkers, and in 1991 he shared the first place in the last Soviet championships in Russian checkers.

Ion Dosca made significant successes on the international level. In addition to winning the World championships in Brazilian draughts in 1999, he also won a silver medal (in 1996) and three bronze medals (in 1993, 2004 and 2007) at these championships. In 2008 at the World Mind Sports Games in Beijing he was leading after the Swiss part of the Brazilian draughts tournament and eventually won the silver medal, losing in the final to the Russia's representative Oleg Dashkov.

Ion Dosca is 15 times national champion of Moldova in Russian checkers, and he also won the American Pool Checkers Association championships in 2000.

Dosca was awarded the Order of Labour Glory for his victory in the 1999 world championships and was nominated by the local media for the Sports person of the year title.

Record in the main international tournaments in Brazilian draughts

References 

Moldovan draughts players
Soviet draughts players
Players of Brazilian draughts
Players of Russian draughts
Pool checkers players
1955 births
Living people
People from Strășeni District